Joseph Weix (February 13, 1874 – March 30, 1925) was an American businessman and politician.

Born in Leroy, Wisconsin, Weix owned a store and was in the lumber business. He served on the Colby, Wisconsin village board and on the Marathon County, Wisconsin Board of Supervisors. In 1921, Weix served in the Wisconsin State Assembly and was a Republican.

Notes

1874 births
1925 deaths
People from Colby, Wisconsin
People from LeRoy, Wisconsin
Businesspeople from Wisconsin
Wisconsin city council members
County supervisors in Wisconsin
Republican Party members of the Wisconsin State Assembly